The OM617 engine family is a straight-5 diesel automobile engine from Mercedes-Benz used in the 1970s and 1980s. It is a direct development from the straight-4 OM616. It was sold in vehicles from 1974 to 1991. The OM617 is considered to be one of the most reliable engines ever produced with engines often reaching over  without being rebuilt and is one of the key reasons for Mercedes' popularity in North America in the 1980s, as it was powerful and reliable compared to other automotive diesels of the time. It is also a very popular choice for the use of alternative fuels, mainly straight or waste vegetable oil and biodiesel, although the use of these fuels may cause engine damage over time if not processed properly before use.

OM617 Naturally Aspirated
Essentially an OM616 with an extra cylinder, it debuted in 1974 with the W115(240 3.0d) chassis. It was originally . Bosch MW inline injection pumps were used, which had flyweight governors and vacuum shutoff. Previous engines had used pneumatic governors, and "gorilla knob" to start and shut off the engine. The North American engines had ADA device equipped pumps which limited fuel at high altitudes to prevent smoking with less dense air. New engine blocks after the .910 had rear mounted oil filter housings, with a combined full flow and bypass filter element. In August 1978 the precombustion chamber was updated to be similar to the new OM617A design for more swirl and more efficient combustion. September 1979 saw a new camshaft with greater valve lift let air and exhaust gases have less resistance. Torque remained at  @ 2400 rpm. In November 1980 the MW style injection pump was replaced with the M type for non-North American engines. Engines were equipped with series wired loop type glow plugs up until 1980 when replaced by the much more reliable pencil type plugs (these had been already used in the OM617A since 1978). Vehicles sold to the North American market had exhaust gas recirculation equipment fitted.

OM617.910

Canister style oil filter at bottom front of engine. Power output was  @ 4000 rpm and torque was  @ 2400 rpm.

Applications:
 1974–1976 240D 3.0 / 300D

OM617.912

This was introduced with the W123 series. Power originally was  @ 4000 rpm, torque  @ 2400 rpm. From September 1979 -   @ 4400 rpm, torque  @ 2400 rpm.

Applications:
 1977–1985 300D
 1977–1981 300D North American
 1977–1985 300D Long
 1977–1981 300CD North American
 1978–1985 300TD

OM617.913

This was an adaption of the .912 to the T1 chassis. It had a downward facing oil filter housing.
 1982–1988 209 D / 309 D / 409 D

OM617.931 and OM617.932

This engine was adapted from the .912 to fit the G Class, main difference being oil pan changes.

Applications:
1979–1991 W460/W461

OM617A Turbocharged
The year 1976 saw the engine adapted to use a turbocharger. This  OM617LA was fitted to the C111-IID test vehicle, and set 16 world land speed and endurance records at the Nardo test facility in Italy. Modifications for production engines included oil squirters to cool the underneath of the pistons; pistons with oil passages; stronger connecting rods; sodium filled valve stems and a stronger nitride-hardened crankshaft. Also an uprated oil pump with separate chain drive was fitted as the turbocharger lubrication required higher flow. Bosch MW injection pumps were calibrated for greater fuel output and fitted with an ALDA device which prevented overfueling until the turbocharger had begun to provide boost pressure. Pencil glow plugs were provided on all OM617A engines.

OM617.950

In 1978, the OM617.950 was mated with the Mercedes-Benz W116 to produce the North American market-only 300SD, the world's first production turbodiesel sedan. These engines pre-dated the introduction of tighter emissions laws, so were not fitted with EGR. Power originally was  @ 4200 rpm, torque  @ 2400 rpm. From October 1979 -  @ 4350 rpm, torque  @ 2400 rpm.

Applications:
 1978–1980 300SD Turbo

OM617.951

The .951 was introduced for 1981 and displaced , using a  bore and stroke. Power originally was  @ 4350 rpm, torque  @ 2400 rpm. From August 1984 -  @ 4350 rpm, torque  @ 2400 rpm. Vehicles sold to the North American market had EGR equipment fitted.

Applications:
 1981–1985 300SD Turbo
 1981 300TD Turbo

OM617.952

The .952 is identical to the .951 apart from minor changes to fit the North American 123 chassis. It was also fitted to the European market W123 wagon, the 300TD. This was the only turbocharged OM617 fitted to a European W123. Power originally was  @ 4350 rpm, torque  @ 2400 rpm. From October 1982 -  @ 4350 rpm, torque  @ 2400 rpm. Vehicles sold to the North American market had EGR equipment fitted.

Applications:
 1981–1985 300D Turbo North American
 1981–1985 300CD Turbo North American
 1982–1985 300TD Turbo
 Military  Hagglund Bv206 Bandvagn

OM617 by AMG
While many people believe the 2001–2004 Mercedes-Benz C 30 CDI AMG was the first and so far only diesel model built in Affalterbach, the 1989 AMG MB 100 D begs to differ. Just two years after the infamous Hammer hit the scene, AMG turned its attention towards Benz's Spanish-made workhorse. AMG offered an upgraded diesel both in 2.4- (OM616) or 3.0-liter form (OM617), tuned to give the light van 98 or 127 horsepower, mostly thanks to a new sequential turbocharger. The extra kraft came in handy, considering the weight penalty of rich leathers and television sets.

Applications: 

 1989 MB100 D AMG 3.0

See also
 List of Mercedes-Benz engines

References

OM617
Diesel engines by model
Straight-five engines